Era 2 is the second studio album by French new-age project Era.

Videos were shot for "Divano", "Infanati" and "Misere Mani" featuring actors Pierre Bouisierie and Irene Bustamante.

Track listing
 "Omen Sore" – 4:39
 "Divano" – 3:53
 "Devore Amante" – 4:14
 "Sentence" – 4:55
 "Don't U" – 3:49
 "Infanati" – 4:26
 "Madona" – 4:17
 "Hymne" – 4:55
 "Misere Mani" – 4:03
 "In Fine" – 4:22
 "In Fine" – 0:43
 silence – 0.57
 "Ghost Finale" (hidden track) – 2:42

Charts

Weekly charts

Year-end charts

Certifications

References

Era (musical project) albums
2000 albums